Quintino (Latin Quintinus, from Quintus) is a Latin-derived male given name meaning "the fifth".

People 
 Quintino Bocaiúva - Brazilian journalist and politician 
 Quintino Vilas Boas Neto - Portuguese artist
 Quintino de Lacerda - Brazilian politician
 José Quintino Dias - Portuguese historical person 
 Tomás Quintino Antunes - Portuguese journalist 
 Quintino (DJ) - Dutch disc jockey (real name Quinten van den Berg)
 Aldo Quintino - American Actor

Places 
 Quintino Bocaiúva (Rio de Janeiro) - neighborhood of Rio de Janeiro
 Quintino Cunha - neighborhood of Fortaleza, Ceará
 Quintino Facci - neighborhood of Ribeirão Preto, São Paulo
 Quintino (Timbó) - neighborhood of Timbó, São Paulo
 Santo Quintino - borough of Sobral de Monte Agraço, Portugal
 Quintinos - borough of Carmo do Paranaíba, Minas Gerais, Brasil.

Other 
 Decididos de Quintino, Aliados de Quintino e Aliança de Quintino - historical carnival associations of Brazil.
 Igreja de São Quintino - historic Portuguese church.

See also 
 Quentin (disambiguation)

Portuguese masculine given names

es:Quintino
pt:Quintino